Def by Temptation is a 1990 American horror film that was written, produced, and directed by James Bond III; and stars Cynthia Bond, Kadeem Hardison, Samuel L. Jackson, and Bill Nunn. The film takes place in New York City in 1990.

Plot
The story is set in New York City and revolves around the relationship between two childhood best friends: Joel (James Bond III), who is raised by his religious grandmother after both of his parents were killed in a car accident, and K (Kadeem Hardison), who abandons his religious upbringing and moves to New York to become an actor.

Joel, a minister like his deceased father (Samuel L. Jackson), becomes disillusioned with Christianity and decides to take a trip to New York to visit his friend, K. While awaiting Joel's arrival, K visits a bar and meets an attractive woman (Cynthia Bond), who is known by the bar patrons and bartenders as a weird "Temptress" brings a lot of men home with her, but unbeknownst to them. she kills the men after they engage in sex. K and the Temptress spend most of the night together at the bar. K, who refuses to go home with the Temptress, returns home in time to help Joel get settled in, saving his life. K catches up with Joel, telling him about the Temptress.

The Temptress' first victim is a womanizing bartender who sleeps with and disrespects women. Her second 'victim' is a married man named Norman, whom she has given AIDS and back slashes to. Norman's wife later finds out he had gotten AIDS from sleeping with another woman, then she shoots and kills him for cheating and transferring AIDS onto her. Her third victim is a gay man named Jonathan. K's friend Dougy (Bill Nunn), a police officer who deals in supernatural cases, notices the men's disappearances after they leave with the Temptress.

The next night, Joel and K go to the bar. While K goes to the bathroom, Joel meets the Temptress, who pretends not to have met K before, leaving K confused and suspicious. Dougy tells K the woman gives him "strange vibes".

The next morning, Joel prepares to go out on a date with the Temptress, who arrives at the house, still pretending she does not know K. K, frustrated over having his feelings manipulated, calls her out over the pretense until he notices she doesn't have a reflection in the mirror. The Temptress then grows hostile towards K. Joel and the Temptress leave, leaving K scared and certain of what he has seen.

At the bar, K tells Dougy about his suspicions. Dougy tells K he believes his suspicions about the Temptress. They review past cases Dougy has worked on, showing K the men who leave with the Temptress are never seen again. K and Dougy go and see Madam Sonya, a fortune teller who reveals the woman is a succubus who murders men who are unfaithful and tempted by her. The Temptress then possesses Sonya, and threatens K and Dougy.

K decides to tell Joel about his earlier meeting with the Temptress at the bar, and that she is not who she says she is. Joel refuses to believe the accusations and K tells Joel to go home for his safety. K then calls Joel's grandmother and informs her of the situations that have occurred and asks her to come to New York to save Joel.

Meanwhile, K and Dougy go to the bar, where the Temptress is, and tell the bartender to put blessed holy water in her drink and then to get away fast. The Temptress has a reaction to the drink. K and Dougy run out of the bar, noticing K's car is gone, and split up. Dougy is chased by a car, then gets into the backseat of another car, which is driven by the bartender, who has been turned into a demon. Dougy is attacked by another demon in the backseat.

Meanwhile, at his house, K is sucked into his television. Blood and viscera explode from the screen, leaving K stuck and screaming inside the television.

Joel visits the Temptress' house, where she drugs him. Joel dreams about his father walking into his bedroom and seeing the Temptress naked in his bed. Joel, knowing his father is dead, wakes up as his grandmother enters the room to be attacked by the demon. Joel grabs a cross and rebukes the succubus, killing her. Joel and his grandma then hug, happy to have survived the attacks.

Later, Dougy arrives at the bar in a limo driven by K. Dougy sits down at the bar, where a woman light his cigarette for him. Quoting an earlier suggestion by the Temptress, he is revealed to now be an incubus. The film ends with a recurring dream sequence of Joel running through smokey streets of New York.

Cast

 James Bond III as Joel Garth
 Z. Wright as young Joel
 Kadeem Hardison as K
 Samuel L. Jackson as Minister Garth
 Bill Nunn as Dougy
 Cynthia Bond as Temptress
 Minnie Gentry as Grandma
 Melba Moore as Madam Sonya 
 Najee as himself
 Freddie Jackson as himself
 Steven Van Cleef as Jonathan
 Sundra Jean Williams as Mrs. Garth
 Michael Michele (film debut) as Lady #6

Release
Def by Temptation was theatrically released on May 11, 1990 and earned $54,582 in eleven venues. At the end of its run, the film grossed $2,218,579.

References

External links
 
 
 
 
 Def by Temptation – at the Troma Entertainment film database

1990 films
1990 horror films
African-American films
American horror films
American independent films
Films set in New York City
Films shot in New York City
Succubi in film
Troma Entertainment films
African-American horror films
1990s English-language films
1990s American films